Iulia is a feminine given name tracing back to the ancient Romans. It is still found in several contemporary languages such as Romanian. Another related name is Iuliana. Iulia may refer to:

Given name
Iulia Aquilia Severa
Iulia Berenice
Iulia Hasdeu
Iulia Motoc
Iulia Murga
Iulia Necula

Places
Iulia (Lydia)
Iulia Concordia
Iulia Gordos
 Iulia, a village in Izvoarele Commune, Tulcea County, Romania

See also
Iuliana, a given name
Julia, a given name

Romanian feminine given names